Wilfredo is a given name which may refer to:

Wilfredo Alicdan (born 1965), Filipino figurative artist
Wilfredo Alvarado (born 1970), Venezuelan football defender
Willy Caballero (born 1981), Argentine football goalkeeper
Wilfredo Caraballo (born 1947), American politician
Wil Cordero (born 1971), Puerto Rican former Major League Baseball player
Wilfredo Gómez (born 1956), three-time world boxing champion from Puerto Rico
Wilfredo Iraheta (born 1967), El Salvadoran retired football defender
Wil Ledezma (born 1981), Major League Baseball pitcher from Venezuela
Wilfredo Martínez (born 1985), Cuban long jumper
Wilfredo Negrón (born 1973), Puerto Rican boxer
Wilfredo Pedraza, Peruvian politician
Wilfredo Santa-Gómez (born 1948), Puerto Rican author
Wilfredo Vázquez (born 1960),  three-time world boxing champion from Puerto Rico
Wilfredo Vázquez, Jr. (born 1984), winner of two superbantamweight world boxing titles
Wilfredo León (born 1993), Cuban-Polish volleyball player
Wilfredo (character), performed by the comedian Matt Roper

See also
Wilfred (disambiguation)
 Wilfried
 Wilf

Spanish masculine given names